Mesolia is a genus of moths of the family Crambidae described by Émile Louis Ragonot in 1889.

Description
Palpi porrect (extending forward), thickly clothed with hair, and extending about twice the length of the head. Maxillary palp triangularly scaled. Frons with a conical projection. Antennae of male thickened and flattened. Tibia with the outer spurs about half the length of inner. Forewings long and narrow, with rounded apex. Veins 4 and 5 from angle of cell and vein 3 absent. Veins 7, 8 and 9 stalked and veins 10 and 11 free. The outer margin produced from apex to vein 5. Hindwings with vein 3 absent. Veins 4 and 5 from angle of cell and vein 6 from upper angle. The upper margin of cell widely separated from veins 8 and vein 7 curving upwards to anastomose with vein 8.

Species
Mesolia albimaculalis Hampson, 1919
Mesolia baboquivariella (Kearfott, 1907)
Mesolia bipunctella Wileman & South, 1918
Mesolia huachucaella Kearfott, 1908
Mesolia incertellus (Zincken, 1821)
Mesolia jamaicensis Hampson, 1919
Mesolia margistrigella Hampson, 1899
Mesolia meyi Bassi, 2013
Mesolia microdontalis (Hampson, 1919)
Mesolia monodella Marion, 1957
Mesolia nipis (Dyar, 1914)
Mesolia oraculella Kearfott, 1908
Mesolia pandavella Ragonot in de Joannis & Ragonot, 1889
Mesolia pelopa (Turner, 1947)
Mesolia plurimellus (Walker, 1863)
Mesolia presidialis Hampson, 1919
Mesolia rectilineella Hampson, 1899
Mesolia scythrastis Turner, 1904
Mesolia uniformella Janse, 1922

References

Ancylolomiini
Taxa named by Émile Louis Ragonot
Crambidae genera